Boswell Bay Airport  is owned by the U.S. Forest Service and is located near Boswell Bay, in the Valdez–Cordova Census Area, Alaska of the U.S. state of Alaska.  The airfield was constructed in 1968 to serve the nearby White Alice radar site, now abandoned.

Facilities and aircraft 
Boswell Bay Airport has one runway designated 4/22 with a 2,612 by 100 ft (796 x 30 m) gravel surface. For the 12-month period ending August 14, 1985, the airport had 400 aircraft operations, an average of 33 per month: 63% air taxi and 38% general aviation.

References

External links

Airports in Chugach Census Area, Alaska